Paul D'Amato (born c. 1948) is an American actor.

Early life, education, and career
Born in Worcester, Massachusetts, D'Amato began working as a stage hand at the age of 14, and decided at the age of 21 that he wanted to become an actor. He attended Emerson College, where he appeared in school productions and also played on the school ice hockey team. In 1974, he moved to Montpelier, Vermont, and acted in a local theatre ensemble. He was well-reviewed as one of the three prisoners in a 1975 stage production of the Jean Genet play, Deathwatch.

Film career
D'Amato's combination of acting experience and ice hockey experience put him in contention for a role in the 1977 film Slap Shot, in which he ultimately wound up appearing as a main antagonist. He thereafter appeared in films including The Deadliest Season (1977 TV film), The Deer Hunter (1978), Firepower (1979), and Heaven's Gate. His appearance in Slap Shot served as the basis of artist John Byrne's rendition of the comic book character, Wolverine. D'Amato also had a stage career, appearing in a Vermont production of Shakespeare's Pericles, Prince of Tyre in 1980. In the 1980s, D'Amato was typically cast as a thug or henchman; in a 1983 pilot for the TV series Murder Ink, his character assaulted a character played by Ellen Barkin, and in the 1987 film Suspect, he "held a razor to Cher's throat... and stabbed [Dennis Quaid]". In the 1990s and 2000s' D'Amato appeared as different characters in multiple episodes of Law & Order and Law & Order: Criminal Intent.

Later life
D'Amato continued to make public appearances in the 2010s, mostly evoking his appearance in Slap Shot. In November 2010, D'Amato dropped the ceremonial first puck at a hockey game between the Danbury Whalers and the Broome County Barons. In July 2012, he came out for an ice skating event to raise finds for Hope Lodge in Worcester. In August 2017, he participated in a reunion of members of the Slap Shot cast in Winnipeg for a golf tournament commemorating the 40th anniversary of the film. By 2019, he was working as a boot-fitter in a Vermont ski shop, which facilitated his own skiing hobby.

Personal life
In the mid-1970s, D'Amato married Bertine Colombo of Montpelier, who he met while they attended adjacent colleges. In 2019, he was engaged to Marina Re.

References

External links

 Matt Shields, "Talking With Dr. Hook From 'Slap Shot'", Bleacher Report (April 25, 2007)

1940s births
Living people
People from Worcester, Massachusetts
Emerson College alumni
American actors